Thad Busby (born November 25, 1974) is a former American football quarterback. He played college football for the Florida State Seminoles and played professionally in the Regional Football League and Arena Football League.

Biography
Busby attended Pace High School in Pace, Florida, and was then drafted by the Toronto Blue Jays in the fourth round of the 1993 Major League Baseball Draft, but did not sign. He attended Florida State University, where he played both football and baseball and compiled a 19-2 record as the Seminoles' starting quarterback in 1996-97.

After his college career, he was also a member of the San Francisco 49ers and Cleveland Browns of the National Football League (NFL), but did not make a regular season roster. He did play in the short-lived Regional Football League in 1999 for the Mobile Admirals, and in the Arena Football League for the Tampa Bay Storm in 2000.

References

1974 births
Living people
People from Santa Rosa County, Florida
Players of American football from Florida
American football quarterbacks
Florida State Seminoles football players
Florida State Seminoles baseball players
San Francisco 49ers players
Cleveland Browns players
Tampa Bay Storm players
Regional Football League players